This article describes the main round of the 2014–15 Women's EHF Champions League.

Format
The top three teams of each group from the group stage advanced to the main round. The 12 teams were split into two groups of six teams. The top four placed teams advanced to the knockout stage. The points gained in the group stage against teams that advance, were carried over.

Group 1

Group 2

References

External links
Official website

2014–15 Women's EHF Champions League